The Haush language (also Manek'enk) was an indigenous language spoken by the Haush people and was formerly spoken on the island of Tierra del Fuego. The Haush were considered the oldest inhabitants of Tierra del Fuego; they inhabited the far eastern tip of the Mitre Peninsula. They made  regular hunting trips to Isla de los Estados.

Before 1850, an estimated 300 people spoke Haush. The last speaker of Haush died around 1920 and the language is considered extinct.

Haush is considered to be related to the Selknam, Gününa Yajich, Teushen, and Tehuelche languages, which collectively belong to the Chonan language family.

See also
Yaghan language
Selknam language
Kawésqar language

Notes

References
Adelaar, Willen F. H. and Pieter Muysken. The languages of the Andes. Cambridge: Cambridge University Press, 2004. .

Chonan languages
Extinct languages of South America
Fuegian languages
Languages extinct in the 1920s